The ARK-4 was a single-engine Soviet flying boat design produced by Chyetverikov.

Specifications

See also
Chyetverikov ARK-3

References 

1930s Soviet patrol aircraft
Flying boats
Chyetverikov aircraft
Twin-engined push-pull aircraft
High-wing aircraft
Aircraft first flown in 1936